Stella Reid (born 3 October 1964) is an English nanny, author and television personality, known publicly as one of the stars of the reality television series Nanny 911. She is co-author of The Nanny Chronicles of Hollywood, Nanny 911: Expert Advice for All Your Parenting Emergencies and The Nanny in Charge.

Early life 
Reid was born in Burnley, Lancashire and attended Towneley High School and Habergham Sixth-form.

Career
Reid moved to the United States in 1989, where she works with families on a one on one basis by offering private consultations as well as through her speaking engagements. She travels the country delivering parenting workshops.

Personal life
Reid lives in Gardena, California with her husband Mike and her son Mason.

References

External links

British expatriates in the United States
Participants in American reality television series
Living people
1964 births
People from Burnley
Nannies
English domestic workers